James Lambert may refer to:

 Jamie Lambert (born 1973), English footballer
 James Lambert (ski jumper) (born 1965), British ski jumper
 James Lambert, Dublin lord mayor in 1859